Me Amarás (English: You'll Love Me) is the second solo studio album recorded by Puerto Rican-American recording artist Ricky Martin, It was released by Sony Discos and Columbia Records on April 13, 1993 (see 1993 in music).

Writing and production
The album was produced by Juan Carlos Calderón wrote all the songs for this album, except for a Spanish version of Laura Branigan's song "Self Control" titled "Qué Día es Hoy", and a Spanish version of "Hooray! Hooray! It's a Holi-Holiday".

Commercial performance
In the Billboard issue dated May 29, 1993, Me Amaras entered the Latin Pop Albums at number twenty-four. It peaked at number twenty-two four weeks later. According to different sources the album sold 700,000 copies or even 1,000,000 copies worldwide. It includes fourth Billboard  Hot Latin Tracks hits: "Me Amaras," "Qué Día Es Hoy" , "Entre el Amor y los Halagos" and "No Me Pidas Más". In Chile, three songs went Platinum.

Track listing

© MCMXCIII. Sony Music Entertainment (México), S.A. de C.V.

Charts

Certifications and sales

|}

References 

1993 albums
Ricky Martin albums
Spanish-language albums
Sony Discos albums
Sony Music Mexico albums
Columbia Records albums
Albums produced by Juan Carlos Calderón